This is a list of the members of the 36th Parliament of Canada, from September 22, 1997 to October 22, 2000.

Members
Members of the House of Commons in the 36th parliament arranged by province.

Newfoundland

* Bill Matthews left the Progressive Conservative to join the Liberal Party in 1999.
** Charlie Power retired from politics, and was replaced by Loyola Hearn in 2000 by-election.

Prince Edward Island

Nova Scotia

* Scott Brison left parliament in 2000 to allow new Tory leader Joe Clark to run in a by-election to win a seat in the House.

New Brunswick

* Angela Vautour left the New Democratic Party to join the Progressive Conservative Party in 1999.

Quebec

* Réjean Lefebvre left the Bloc Québécois due to drunken driving to sit as an Independent in 1999.
** André Harvey, David Price, and Diane St-Jacques left the Progressive Conservative to join the Liberal Party in 2000.
*** Marcel Massé retired from politics, and was replaced by Marcel Proulx in 1999 by-election.
**** Sheila Finestone was appointed to the Senate, and was replaced by Irwin Cotler in a 1999 by-election.
***** Jean Charest left parliament to become leader of the Quebec Liberal Party, and was replaced by Serge Cardin in a 1998 by-election.

Ontario

* Jim Jones left the Progressive Conservative Party to join the Canadian Alliance in 2000.
** Shaughnessy Cohen died in office, and was replaced by Richard Limoges after a 1999 byelection
*** Sergio Marchi left politics to be appointed ambassador to the World Trade Organization; he was replaced by Judy Sgro after a 1999 byelection.

Manitoba

* On March 26, 2000 all members of the Reform Party of Canada switched to the new Canadian Alliance.
** Jake Hoeppner expelled from Reform Party and sat as Independent in 1999.

Saskatchewan

* On March 26, 2000 all members of the Reform Party of Canada switched to the new Canadian Alliance.
** Rick Laliberte left the New Democratic Party to join the Liberal Party in 2000.
*** Chris Axworthy left parliament to join the provincial cabinet, and was replaced by Dennis Gruending in a 1999 byelection.

Alberta

* On March 26, 2000 all members of the Reform Party of Canada switched to the new Canadian Alliance.
** Jack Ramsay expelled from Canadian Alliance due to criminal charges and sat as Independent in 2000.

British Columbia

* On March 26, 2000 all members of the Reform Party of Canada switched to the new Canadian Alliance.
** Jim Hart resigned his seat so that new Canadian Alliance leader Stockwell Day could run in a by-election to win a seat in the House.
*** Sharon Hayes resigned from parliament to care for her ailing husband, and was replaced by Lou Sekora after a 1998 byelection.

Northern Territories

House Members Of The 36th Parliament Of Canada, List Of
36